was a Japanese artist and engraver who spent most of his life in France and whose work is featured at the Yokohama Museum of Art.

Biography
Born in present-day Yokohama, he moved to France in 1919 (via the United States) to learn copperplate printing, and never returned to Japan.

According to one source his work showsthe influence of Chagall, Dufy, Laboureur, Pascin, Picasso and Edouard Goerg Alas. He revived the so-called Mezzotint technique and found the power and the depth of black in wood engraving. Works such as Hasegawa's come from the heart. His art is subtle and delicate. It is an ideal created in the silence of the workshop with memories of the recent past, transposed by the sharpness and delicacy of Oriental sensibilities.

Distinctions and awards
Gold Medal at the International Exposition, Paris, 1937 
Légion d’honneur, 1935
Chevalier des Arts et des Lettres
Membre Correspondent of the French Academy of Fine Arts, 1964
Order of the Sacred Treasure, Third Class, Japan, 1967

References

Further reading
 Hasegawa Kiyoshi Hanga sakuhin-Shû [L'oeuvre gravé de Kiyoshi Hasegawa], Bijutsu Schuppan-Sha, Tokyo, 1981.
 Kiyoshi Hasegawa, Hakuchû ni Kami wo miru [Voir Dieu dans la lumière], Hakusuisha, Tokyo, 1982.
 A propos de l’oeuvre gravé de Kiyoshi Hasegawa, Fondation Taylor, 25/06 – 18/07/1998, Ed.
Fondation Taylor, Paris, 1998.
 Groult, Martine, Etude de la correspondance française de Kiyoshi Hasegawa, 1998 (Travail de pré-inventaire).

External links
 Yokohama Museum of Art

1891 births
1980 deaths
People from Yokohama
Japanese artists
Recipients of the Legion of Honour
Japanese emigrants to France